Southeast Guilford High School is a public high school located in southeast Guilford County, off U.S. Route 421. Southeast High School is part of the Guilford County School System. Southeast High School is located near Forest Oaks Country Club, former site of the Wyndham Championship.

The campus consists of two main buildings and numerous mobile units for classrooms, including a new cafeteria. The school also has a football stadium,soccer field, marching field, baseball field, track, tennis courts and a weight room.

Southeast accommodates about 1,400 students. The state's schools average about 989 students, and schools in the Guilford County School District (GCSD) average to 911 students. Southeast Guilford falls below the other enrollment percentages of other schools for Advanced Placement (AP) classes in the district by 2%, but exceeds the state enrollment by 1% (5% enrollment for SEHS, 7% GCSD, 4% NC). Southeast also has a 15% enrollment in College Technical Prep courses, while GCSD has 13% of their students enrolled, and North Carolina has approximately 16% enrollment.

Athletics

Boys & Girls
Track
Cross Country
Swimming
Lacrosse
Golf
Basketball
Soccer
Tennis
Cheerleading

Boys
Football
Baseball
Wrestling

Girls
Softball
Volleyball

Notable alumni
Eugene Godsoe, former competitive swimmer who competed at the 2013 World Aquatics Championships

References

Sources
 

1962 establishments in North Carolina
Educational institutions established in 1962
Public high schools in North Carolina
Schools in Guilford County, North Carolina